Loser on loser play is a type of declarer's play in contract bridge, usually in trump contracts, where the declarer discards a loser card (the one that is bound to be given up anyway) on an opponent's winner, instead of ruffing.

Loser on loser technique can be executed for the following goals:
to maintain trump control of the hand,
to transfer the ruff to a "safer" suit (e.g. in order to perform a later crossruff).
as part of an avoidance play (e.g. the scissors coup)
to rectify the count for a subsequent squeeze play.
as part of an endplay.

Example
 After the auction,
 South plays in a 4-3 spade fit. The defense leads and continues hearts. The declarer has four clubs, two diamonds and four spade tricks in total; however, assuming the most probable 4-2 trump break, if South ruffs the second heart in hand, the opponent with four trumps can gain later control of the hand by ruffing one of South's minor winners and cashing the remaining hearts. Thus, South must discard his losing diamonds on 2nd and 3rd heart, allowing the dummy's shorter trumps to ruff the fourth round, or to regain control with a minor-suit winner. After that, South can draw trumps and claim the rest.

See also
 Safety play
 Duck (bridge)

References

Contract bridge card play